Robert James Blackmon (born May 12, 1967) is a former American football safety in the National Football League (NFL). He was drafted by the Seattle Seahawks in the second round of the 1990 NFL Draft. He played college football at Baylor.

Blackmon also played for the Indianapolis Colts.

References 

1967 births
Living people
People from Bay City, Texas
American football safeties
Baylor Bears football players
Seattle Seahawks players
Indianapolis Colts players